The Otto W. Rohland Building is a historic building in Saint Paul, Minnesota, United States.  Otto Rohland immigrated from Germany in 1867; this Victorian shop/residential building was built in 1891 and served as Rohland's grocery store and meat market into the 1950s; one source says the market was at 461 Old Fort Road.

The Rohland Building was nominated to National Register of Historic Places in 1983.  It received reference number #83004865 and the listing code DR, meaning "Date Received" and nomination pending, but the listing was never finalized.

References

Buildings and structures in Saint Paul, Minnesota
Commercial buildings completed in 1891
Retail buildings in Minnesota